The Persian-language magazine Ruznama-yi Millati (translated: The National Journal), was published between 1866 and 1870 in Tehran. It was published monthly in a total of 33 issues. Together with the magazines Ruznama-i Dawlati and the Ruznama-i ʿilmi, Ruznama-yi Millati used to be published under the superintendence of Iʿtizāduʾ s-Salṭana. The upper part of each page shows the figure of a mosque, which displays the national character of the magazine.

Its content focuses primary on the bibliographies of famous poets. A stated goal of the magazine was to move away from the written language of the elite to the spoken language of the masses by adopting a style directed toward communication with the people (mardum).

References

External links
 Online-Version: Rūznāma-i millatī
 Digital Collections: Arabische, persische und osmanisch-türkische Periodika

Defunct magazines published in Iran
Magazines established in 1866
Magazines disestablished in 1870
Magazines published in Tehran
Monthly magazines published in Iran
Persian-language magazines
Qajar Iran